Bruh may refer to:

 African American vernacular for someone's brother 
 A term used in bro culture
 Bruh (TV series)
 An archaic term for the rhesus macaque
 A variant of bro; can be expressed as a meme term for something exasperating, embarrassing, or questionable in some way.

See also
 Bruh Bruh
 Bro (disambiguation)